Koshan Danuska (born 04 March 1993) is a Sri Lankan cricketer. He made his Twenty20 debut on 5 January 2016, for Ragama Cricket Club in the 2015–16 AIA Premier T20 Tournament. In August 2021, he was named in the SLC Greys team for the 2021 SLC Invitational T20 League tournament. However, prior to the first match, he failed a fitness test.

References

External links
 

2000 births
Living people
Sri Lankan cricketers
Bloomfield Cricket and Athletic Club cricketers
Panadura Sports Club cricketers
Ragama Cricket Club cricketers
Place of birth missing (living people)